KLTQ (90.9 FM) is a radio station in Thatcher, Arizona. The station is currently owned by Educational Media Foundation. and broadcasts the K-Love contemporary Christian music network.

History
KLTQ signed on the air in 2012 as KSFQ. The station was owned by the Cochise Community Radio Corporation, the noncommercial division of Cochise Broadcasting, but it barely operated at all. In a 2017 consent decree, the Federal Communications Commission required Cochise to unload the licenses of KSFQ and nine other stations that had minimal to nonexistent broadcast histories. The station was donated to Good News Radio Broadcasting, Inc., owners of Tucson's KVOI, that September.

Effective December 16, 2022, Good News Radio Broadcasting donated KSFQ and sister station KXMK to Educational Media Foundation. EMF changed the station's call sign to KLTQ on January 10, 2023.

References

External links
 

Radio stations established in 2013
2013 establishments in Arizona
LTQ (FM)
Educational Media Foundation radio stations
Contemporary Christian radio stations in the United States